ESPN and its family of domestic networks (ESPN on ABC, ESPN2, ESPNU, ESPN+, ESPN Deportes and (to a lesser extent) ESPN Classic) have or previously had rights to the following sports and events:

Current properties

American football
NFL on ESPN
Monday Night Football: 2006–present
 Manningcast
 Saturday night regular season games (Weeks 14-18 only).
Pro Bowl: 1988–1994, 2003–2005, 2010, 2015–2023 (acquired rights from ABC through 2005, acquired from CBS in 2010, direct from 2015 onward)
 NFL playoffs
 Conference wild card games (alternating years).
 Super Bowl (starting in 2027).

ESPN College Football
Bowl Games: 1982–present (contracts with individual bowl games; the first live college football game telecast on ESPN was the 1982 Independence Bowl, Kansas St. vs. Wisconsin)
College Football Playoff: January 2015–2026
ACC: 1998–2036
Big Ten: 1979–2023 (originally tape delayed) 
Big 12: 2007–2025
Brigham Young University: 2011-2020 (shared with BYU TV; BYU reserves all rights to their events)
MAC: 2003–present (shared with ASN since 2015)
Pac-12: 2007–2023
SEC: partial rights 1984–2023 (shared with CBS since 1998) 2024–present full rights
Sun Belt: 2001–2031 
MEAC: 2005–present
Turkey Day Classic: 2006–2013, 2016–present online
Ohio Valley Conference (2014–present, online only)
Southern Conference (2014–present, online only)
Northeast Conference (2014–present, online only)
Gulf South Conference (2014–present, online only)
NCAA Division I FCS (formerly Division I-AA), Division II, and Division III playoffs (selected games) and championship games.
NAIA National Football Championship (2014–present)
Select other games are carried online through ESPN3, simulcasting local or regional sports networks and purchased à la carte.

XFL: 2020, 2023-2027

Other:
High School Showcase: Select high school football games, rights purchased à la carte from various state associations (2005–present)

Association football

Soccer
Soccer on ESPN

Clubs

International Champions Cup
EFL (including Cup) (2019-2022, 2022-2025)
The FA (2019-2022, 2022-2025)
Cup
Women's FA Cup
FA Youth Cup
Community Shield
Women's FA Community Shield
DFL (?–2012, 2020–2026)
Bundesliga
2.Bundesliga
Supercup
DFB-Pokal
La Liga (2009-2012, 2021-2029)
RFEF
Copa del Rey
Copa de la Reina
Supercopa de España
Supercopa de España Femenina
Swedish Allsvenskan
Danish Superliga
DBU Pokalen
Eredivisie
Chinese Super League
USL
Indian Super League

Baseball

ESPN Major League Baseball: 1990–2028
 Opening night games.
 Sunday Night Baseball
 KayRod Cast
 Exclusive federal holiday games:
 Memorial Day
 Juneteenth
 Independence Day
 Labor Day
 Little League Classic.
 MLB postseason:
 American League Wild Card Series
 National League Wild Card Series 

Little League World Series
1985–2030

Basketball

NBA on ESPN: 1982–1984, 2002–2025
 Wednesday and Friday night regular season games (partially exclusive).
 Saturday Primetime
 Sunday Showcase
 NBA in Stephen A's World
 Exclusive Christmas games.
 NBA Playoffs:
 Exclusive conference play-in tournaments (alternating years with TNT).
 First round of the playoffs (partially exclusive, select years).
 Exclusive conference semifinals with (alternating years with TNT).
 Exclusive conference finals (alternating years with TNT).
 Exclusive NBA Finals.

WNBA on ESPN: 1997–2025

ESPN College Basketball
ACC : 1979–2036
Big Ten: 1979–2023
Big 12: 1997–2025
Pac-12: 2012–2023
SEC: ?–2023

FIBA
FIBA Basketball World Cup
FIBA Women's Basketball World Cup

The Basketball Tournament: 2014–present

Cricket
New Zealand national cricket team
West Indies national cricket team
Regional Super50

Handball
World Men's Handball Championship
2021 World Men's Handball Championship
2023 World Men's Handball Championship

Ice Hockey

NHL on ESPN
1985–1988 (National television deal, agreements with individual clubs as early as 1979)
1992–2004
2021–2028
 Exclusive Thursday and Saturday night regular season games.
 Thanksgiving Showdown (odd-numbered years)
 Heritage Classic (odd-numbered years)
 Stadium Series (odd-numbered years)
 NHL All-Star Weekend
 All-Star Skills Challenge
 All-Star Game
 Stanley Cup Playoffs
 First round of the playoffs (partially exclusive, select years).
 Exclusive conference semifinals with (alternating years with TNT).
 Exclusive conference finals (alternating years with TNT).
 Exclusive Stanley Cup final (even-numbered years).

NCAA Ice Hockey Tournament
Frozen Four (Division I Men's Championship) 1980-2024
Division I Women's Championship 2001-2024

World Cup of Hockey 2016-

Tennis

Tennis on ESPN
Australian Open: 1984–present
The Championships, Wimbledon: 2003–present (exclusive since 2012)
US Open: 2009–present (exclusive since 2015)
US Open Series: 2004–present
ATP Finals
Indian Wells Masters: ?–2007, 2011–present
Miami Open: 1985–2007, 2011–present

Golf

Golf on ESPN
Masters Tournament: 2008–present (shared with and co-produced by CBS)
PGA Championship: 2020–present (shared with and co-produced by CBS)
Asia-Pacific Amateur Championship 
Latin America Amateur Championship

Canadian football

Canadian Football League
1983–1986 (approximate)
1994–1997
2008–2013 (ESPN3 only; by virtue in its stake in Canadian broadcaster TSN, the official broadcaster of the CFL, it held internet streaming rights.)
2013–present (Select games on ESPN2, streaming coverage on ESPN+)

Motorsports 
Formula One: 1984–1997; 2018–present
FIA Formula 2
FIA Formula 3
Porsche Supercup
Superstar Racing Experience: 2023-

Rugby Union 
Super Rugby
Pro 14
World Tens

College and high school sports 

 ESPN College Baseball (2003–present)
 ESPN College Basketball (1979–present)
 ESPN College Football (1979–present)
 ESPN College Hockey (2005–present)
 ESPN College Lacrosse (2005–present)
 ESPN College Soccer (2005–present)
 ESPN College Softball (2005–present)
 ESPN College Volleyball (2005–present)
 High School Showcase (2005–present)

Combat Sports

Mixed Martial Arts 

 Ultimate Fighting Championship: 2019-2023
 Professional Fighters League: ESPN2

Boxing 

 Top Rank: 2017-2025

Former properties

National teams
UEFA; including Men's and Women's Euro, UEFA Nations League, and Youth competitions
United States men's national soccer team: 1996–2022
United States women's national soccer team

FIFA World Cup

 Finals: 1986, 1994-2014
 UEFA Qualifying: 2018-2022

Australian Football League
2009–2011

UEFA Champions League
1995–2009
Major Indoor Soccer League
1985–1987
2005–2006 (championship games only)

ESPN Major League Soccer (1996–2022)

Premier League 
2009–2013
Lega Serie A (2018-2021)
Serie A
Coppa Italia
Supercoppa Italiana
IndyCar Series
1996–2008 (ESPN continued to produce the broadcasts of five races that aired on ABC through 2018, including the Indianapolis 500.)

CART on ESPN
1980–2001
2007 (series merged with IRL, beginning with the 2008 season)

NASCAR on ESPN
1981–2000 (Contracts with individual races)
2001–2002 (Contract with NASCAR, Truck Series only)
2007–2014 (Contract with NASCAR)

NHRA
1980(?)–2000 (Contracts with individual races)
2001–2015 (Contract with NHRA)

Global RallyCross Championship
2011–2013

American Le Mans Series
1999–2013

Thoroughbred Racing on ESPN
Breeders Cup (2006–2011)
Premier Boxing Champions

 2015–2017, returned again for 2020 only, based on the Top Rank main feed.

AWA Championship Wrestling

1985-1990

Global Wrestling Federation

1991-1994

UWF Fury Hour

1995 only

References

ESPN
ESPN2
ABC Sports